Nigeria competed at the 2020 Summer Olympics in Tokyo. Originally scheduled to take place from 24 July to 9 August 2020, the Games were postponed to 23 July to 8 August 2021, because of the COVID-19 pandemic. Since the nation made its debut in 1952, Nigerian athletes have appeared in every edition of the Summer Olympic Games, with the exception of the 1976 Summer Olympics in Montreal because of the African boycott.

Medalists

Competitors
The following is the list of number of Nigerian competitors in the Games.

Summary

Mass disqualification of Nigerian athletes
On 28 July 2021, the Athletics Integrity Unit announced that Nigeria had failed to meet the minimum drug testing requirements as per "Rule 15", which requires at least three no-notice outside of competition blood and urine drug tests no less than three weeks apart for 10 of their athletes. As such, all 10 athletes were disqualified from participating in their events.

Doping
On 31 July 2021 the Athletics Integrity Unit announced that Blessing Okagbare was provisionally suspended following a positive doping test for Human Growth Hormone from a sample collected outside of competition on 19 July 2021.

Athletics

Nigerian athletes further achieved the entry standards, either by qualifying time or by world ranking, in the following track and field events (up to a maximum of 3 athletes in each event):

Track & road events
Men

Women

Mixed

Field events

Badminton

Nigeria entered three badminton players for each of the following events into the Olympic tournament. Godwin Olofua and Anuoluwapo Juwon Opeyori (men's doubles), with Dorcas Ajoke Adesokan on the women's side, topped the field of badminton players from Africa to lock the places on the Nigerian squad in their respective events based on the BWF Race to Tokyo Rankings.

Basketball

Summary

Men's tournament

Nigeria men's basketball team qualified for the Olympics as the highest-ranked African squad at the 2019 FIBA World Cup in China.

Team roster

Group play

Women's tournament

Nigeria women's basketball team qualified for the Olympics as one of two highest-ranked eligible squads from group A at the Belgrade meet of the 2020 FIBA Women's Olympic Qualifying Tournament, marking the country's recurrence to the sporting event after 16 years.

Team roster

Group play

Canoeing

Sprint
Nigeria qualified a single boat (women's C-1 200 m) for the Games by winning the gold medal at the 2019 African Games in Rabat, Morocco, marking the country's Olympic debut in this sporting discipline.

Qualification Legend: FA = Qualify to final (medal); FB = Qualify to final B (non-medal)

Gymnastics

Artistic
Nigeria entered one artistic gymnast into the Olympic competition. Uche Eke booked a spot in the men's individual all-around and apparatus events by winning the bronze medal at the 2021 African Gymnastics Championships in Cairo, Egypt. This marks the country's Olympic debut in gymnastics.

Men

Rowing

Nigeria qualified one boat in the women's single sculls for the Games by finishing third in the B-final and securing the last of five berths available at the 2019 FISA African Olympic Qualification Regatta in Tunis, Tunisia.

Qualification Legend: FA=Final A (medal); FB=Final B (non-medal); FC=Final C (non-medal); FD=Final D (non-medal); FE=Final E (non-medal); FF=Final F (non-medal); SA/B=Semifinals A/B; SC/D=Semifinals C/D; SE/F=Semifinals E/F; QF=Quarterfinals; R=Repechage

Swimming

Nigeria received a universality invitation from FINA to send a top-ranked female swimmer in her respective individual events to the Olympics, based on the FINA Points System of June 28, 2021.

Table tennis
 
Nigeria entered four athletes into the table tennis competition at the Games. Olajide Omotayo, along with Olympic veterans Offiong Edem and Olufunke Oshonaike, scored a semifinal victories to occupy the available spots each in the men's and women's singles, respectively, at the 2020 African Olympic Qualification Tournament in Tunis, Tunisia. For Oshonaike, she set a historic record by becoming the first ever African woman to participate in seven editions of the Summer Olympic Games.

Taekwondo

Nigeria entered one athlete into the taekwondo competition at the Games for the first time since London 2012. Elizabeth Anyanacho secured a spot in the women's welterweight category (67 kg) with a top two finish at the 2020 African Qualification Tournament in Rabat, Morocco.

Wrestling

Nigeria qualified five wrestlers for each of the following classes into the Olympic competition. One of them finished among the top six to book an Olympic berth in the women's freestyle 57 kg at the 2019 World Championships, while four additional licenses were awarded to the Nigerian wrestlers, who progressed to the top two finals of their respective weight categories at the 2021 African & Oceania Qualification Tournament in Hammamet, Tunisia.

Freestyle

References

Nations at the 2020 Summer Olympics
2020
2021 in Nigerian sport